The following is the Barbadian Table of Precedence.
The President of Barbados (Dame Sandra Mason)
The Prime Minister (Mia Mottley)
The Chief Justice (Sir Patterson Cheltenham)
The Members of the Cabinet
The Attorney-General of Barbados, as the first minister to be sworn-in after the Prime Minister.
Other cabinet ministers, their own order unknown.
The former Governors-General (Sir Elliott Belgrave)
The National Heroes
The President of the Senate (Reginald Farley)
The Speaker of the House of Assembly (Arthur Holder)
The Leader of the Opposition (Bishop Joseph Atherley)
The former Prime Ministers, and the former Chief Justices
The Members of the President's Privy Council of Barbados
The Chairman of the Barbados Christian Council
The Ambassadors and High Commissioners
The Justices of the Court of Appeals, and the Judges of the High Court
The Parliamentary Secretaries
The Deputy President of the Senate
The Deputy Speaker of the House of Assembly
The Members of the Senate
The Members of the House of Assembly
The spouses of deceased dignitaries such as: Governors-General, Prime Ministers, and National Heroes
The Chairmen of the Commissions established under the Constitution
The Head of the Civil Service
The Ombudsman, Director of Public Prosecutions, and Auditor General
The Director of Finance and Economic Affairs, the Solicitor General, the Chief Parliamentary Counsel, the Permanent Secretaries, and the Governor of the Central Bank
The Ambassadors/High Commission (Overseas)
The Chief of Staff for the Barbados Defence Force, and the Commissioner of Police
The Chancellor, University of the West Indies;
The Chairman;
The Cave Hill Campus Council, University of the West Indies;
The Principal, Cave Hill Campus; and the Pro Vice Chancellor of the University of the West Indies.
The former Ministers
The Members of The Order of the Caribbean Community, and the holders of knighthoods conferred under the monarchy of Barbados.
The holders of the Companion of Honour of Barbados
The holders of the Companions of the Order of St. Michael and St. George
The Heads of the regional bodies with diplomatic status.
The Related grades, and the Clerk of Parliament
The Chargé d'affaires and Acting High Commissioners, Deputy High Commissioners, Counsellors in Embassies, High Commissions and Legations, Consul-General - Chefs de Poste
The Consuls - Chefs de Posts
The Members of the Commissions established under the Constitution
The Chairmen of Statutory Boards
The Heads of Government Departments, including the Chief Technical Officers of departments integrated in Ministries, The Chief Magistrate, and the Chief Executive Officers of Statutory Boards
Honorary Consuls, Vice-Consuls in Embassies, and High Commissions and Legations

See also

Government of Barbados
Order of precedence
List of heads of state by diplomatic precedence

References

Table of precedence for Barbados, Barbados Ministry of Foreign Affairs and Foreign Trade (As of July 2008)

Barbados
Order of precedence, Barbadian
Order of precedence
Lists of political office-holders in Barbados